Atça railway station is a railway station in Atça, Turkey. It is located in the southwest of the town, on the north side of the D.320 state highway. TCDD Taşımacılık operates regional train service from İzmir or Söke to Denizli. Atça station was originally opened in 1881, by the Ottoman Railway Company, as part of the extension of their railway from Aydın.

Connections
The Aydın Metropolitan Municipality operates regional bus service on the D.320.

References

Railway stations in Aydın Province
Railway stations opened in 1881
1881 establishments in the Ottoman Empire